Western Frontier is a 1935 American Western film directed by Albert Herman and written by Nate Gatzert. The film stars Ken Maynard, Lucile Browne, Nora Lane, Robert 'Buzz' Henry, Frank Yaconelli and Otis Harlan. The film was released on August 7, 1935, by Columbia Pictures.

Plot

Cast          
Ken Maynard as Ken Masters
Lucile Browne as Mary Harper
Nora Lane as Gail Masters / Goldie
Robert 'Buzz' Henry as Pee Wee Harper 
Frank Yaconelli as Hawhaw
Otis Harlan as Cookie
Harold Goodwin as Morgan
Frank Hagney as Link
Gordon Griffith as Steve 
James A. Marcus as Marshal Bat Mannington 
William Gould as Jed

References

External links
 

1935 films
American Western (genre) films
1935 Western (genre) films
Columbia Pictures films
Films directed by Albert Herman
American black-and-white films
1930s English-language films
1930s American films